Celtic metal is a subgenre of folk metal that developed in the 1990s in Ireland. The genre is a fusion of heavy metal and Celtic rock. The early pioneers of the genre were the Irish bands Cruachan, Primordial and Waylander. The genre has since expanded beyond Irish shores and is known to be performed today by bands from numerous other countries.

History 

The origins of Celtic metal can be traced to the earliest known exponent of folk metal, the English band Skyclad. Their "ambitious" and "groundbreaking" debut album The Wayward Sons of Mother Earth was released in 1990 with the song "The Widdershins Jig" acclaimed as "particularly significant" and "a certain first in the realms of Metal". This debut album made an impact on a young Keith Fay who had formed a Tolkien-inspired black metal band by the name of Minas Tirith.

Inspired by the music of Skyclad and Horslips, Keith Fay set out to combine black metal with the folk music of Ireland. He formed the Irish band Cruachan in 1992 with a demo recording released in 1993. Like Waylander, Keith Fay also credits the Irish rock band Horslips as a "huge influence on Cruachan," further noting that "what they were doing in the 70s is the equivalent of what we do now." Cruachan's debut album Tuatha na Gael was released in 1995 and the band has since been acclaimed as having "gone the greatest lengths of anyone in their attempts to expand" the genre of folk metal. With a specific focus on Celtic music and the use of Celtic mythology in their lyrics, Cruachan's style of folk metal is known today as Celtic metal.

Parallel to Cruachan, the black metal act Primordial also released a demo recording in 1993 and "found themselves heralded as frontrunners in the burgeoning second-wave black metal movement." Irish music plays "a very big role" in Primordial but in "a dark and subtle way" through the chords and timings.

The year 1993 also saw the formation of Waylander. With vocalist Ciaran O'Hagan fronting the group, they released a demo recording in 1995. A debut album Reawakening Pride Once Lost was unveiled in 1998.
O'Hagan notes that it was a coincidence that "Primordial, Cruachan and Waylander sprang up within little more than a year of each other." Since then a few other bands from Ireland have emerged to perform Celtic metal including Geasa and Mael Mórdha.

Since the turn of the millennium, the genre has expanded and many bands beyond the shores of Ireland can be found today performing Celtic metal. This includes Eluveitie from Switzerland, Ithilien from Belgium, Mägo de Oz from Spain, Suidakra from Germany, Leah from Canada, and Skiltron from Argentina.

Despite the Irish origins of the genre, Celtic metal is not known to be popular in Ireland. Ciaran O'Hagan of Waylander notes that while "Primordial are Ireland’s biggest Metal band in terms of sales and international profile" the band would be "lucky to sell much more than 500 copies of their albums in their own country or pull more than 300 punters to a gig." Bands in the genre have experienced a more enthusiastic reception elsewhere with Mägo de Oz notably experiencing strong chart success in Latin America and  their native Spain.

Characteristics 
Similar to its parent genre of folk metal, the music of Celtic metal is a diverse collection with bands pursuing different subgenres of heavy metal music. While bands such as Suidakra ply their trade with the more extreme subgenres of black or death metal, other groups like Mägo de Oz and Skiltron prefer a more traditional or power metal sound, and Leah performs a symphonic metal sound with world music influences.

Many bands in the genre enhance their sound with the use of a folk instrument. Bagpipes are used by bands such as Skiltron and Ithilien. The fiddle is used by such bands as Mägo de Oz, Ithilien and Eluveitie. The tin whistle and flute, can be found in such bands as Cruachan, Ithilien, Waylander and Eluveitie. While the Irish bands of the genre make use of native instruments such as the uilleann pipe and bodhrán.

See also 
List of Celtic metal musicians

References 

20th-century music genres
21st-century music genres
Celtic music

Folk metal
Heavy metal genres